The 2001 Anaheim Angels season involved the Angels finishing third in the American League west with a record of 75 wins and 87 losses.

Offseason
December 7, 2000: Tim Belcher was signed as a free agent with the Anaheim Angels.
December 21, 2000: Aaron Small was signed as a free agent with the Anaheim Angels.
 January 16, 2001: José Canseco signed as a free agent with the Anaheim Angels.
March 25, 2001: Tim Belcher retired during spring training.
 March 28, 2001: José Canseco was released by the Anaheim Angels.
March 28, 2001: Glenallen Hill was traded by the New York Yankees to the Anaheim Angels for Darren Blakely (minors).

Regular season

Season standings

Record vs. opponents

Notable Transactions
May 4, 2001: Aaron Small was released by the Anaheim Angels.
June 1, 2001: Glenallen Hill was released by the Anaheim Angels.
July 13, 2001: Chone Figgins was traded by the Colorado Rockies to the Anaheim Angels for Kimera Bartee.

Roster

Player stats

Batting

Starters by position
Note: Pos = Position; G = Games played; AB = At bats; H = Hits; Avg. = Batting average; HR = Home runs; RBI = Runs batted in

Other batters
Note: G = Games played; AB = At bats; H = Hits; Avg. = Batting average; HR = Home runs; RBI = Runs batted in

Pitching

Starting pitchers
Note: G = Games pitched; IP = Innings pitched; W = Wins; L = Losses; ERA = Earned run average; SO = Strikeouts

Other pitchers
Note: G = Games pitched; IP = Innings pitched; W = Wins; L = Losses; ERA = Earned run average; SO = Strikeouts

Relief pitchers
Note: G = Games pitched; W = Wins; L = Losses; SV = Saves; ERA = Earned run average; SO = Strikeouts

Farm system

LEAGUE CHAMPIONS: Arkansas

References

2001 Anaheim Angels at Baseball Reference
2001 Anaheim Angels at Baseball Almanac

Los Angeles Angels seasons
Los
Los